Matsés, also referred to as Mayoruna in Brazil, is an Indigenous language utilized by the inhabitants of the border regions of Brazil-Peru. A term that hailed from Quechua origin, Mayoruna translates in English to mayu = river; runa = people. Colonizers and missionaries during the 17th century, used this term, to make reference to the Indigenous peoples that occupied the lower Ucayali Region (Amazonian region of Peru), Upper Solimões (upper stretches of the Amazon River in Brazil) and Vale do Javari (largest Indigenous territories in Brazil that border Peru) (De Almeida Matos, 2003). Matsés communities are located along the Javari River basin of the Amazon, which draws out the boundaries between Brazil and Peru, hence the term river people. It is important to note that this term, was previously used by Jesuits to refer to inhabitants of that area, but is not formally a word in the Matsés language (Fleck, 2003, p. 4-5). The language is vigorous and is spoken by all age groups in the Matsés communities. In the Matsés communities several other Indigenous languages are also spoken by women who have been captured from neighboring tribes and some mixture of the languages occur (Fields & Wise 1976 p. 1, Fleck 2006 p. 542). Dialects are Peruvian Matsés, Brazilian Matsés, and the extinct Paud Usunkid.

Number of Speakers and Level of Endangerment 
From research gathered in 2003, Fleck states that the Matsés language is spoken by approximately 2000-2200 Amerindians, since being contacted back in 1969 (Fleck, 2003, ii). In Brazil, the Matsés inhabit the Vale do Javari Indigenous Territory (IT) that covers 8,519,800 hectares of land. The land is distributed into eight communities that are mostly located within the IT borders. According to a more recent census of 2007, the Matsés population in Brazil reached a total of 1,143 people. Meanwhile, in 1998, Peru recognizes the Matsés population to have reached a total of 1,314 people. It is very common for Matsés families under the northern Pano group, to shift between villages including crossing the frontiers. As a result, it becomes difficult to establish trustworthy data for the Matés populations in Brazil and Peru. Currently, the population of Matsés in Brazil, identify themselves as monolingual, where most of the children in the Matsés communities are nurtured and taught exclusively in the Indigenous language. For this reason, the level of endangerment of this language is relatively low. The Instituto Socioambiental states: "Only those people who have worked or studied in the surrounding Peruvian or Brazilian towns speak Portuguese or Spanish fluently." Therefore, this is a great indicator that the language will sustain itself throughout generations. One of the most important functions of language is to produce a social reality that is reflective of that languages’ culture. A child that is raised learning the language, enables the continuation of the cultural traditions, values, and beliefs, furthering the chances of that language ever being considered endangered (De Almeida Matos, 2003).

History of the People

Contact with Indigenous and Non-Indigenous People 
The origins of the Matsés population are directly related to the merger of various Indigenous communities, that did not always speak mutually intelligible languages. Historically, the Matsés participated in looting and planned raids on other Pano groups. The incentive for these attacks, involved the massacre of that particular Pano group's Indigenous men, so that their women and children became powerless from the lack of protection. The Matsés, consequently, would inflict their superiority and dominance by killing off warrior men of the other Indigenous’ groups so that the women and children of the other groups would have no other choice but to join the Matsés, in addition to learning to assimilate to their new family and lifestyle. Roughly between the 1870s to about the 1920s, the Matsés had lost their access to the Javari River due to the peak of the rubber boom which was centered in the Amazon basin, where the extraction and commercialization of rubber threaten the Matsés lifestyle (De Almeida Matos, 2003). During this period, the Matsés avoided conflict with non-Indigenous people and relocated to interfluvial areas, while maintaining a pattern of dispersal that allows them to avoid the rubber extraction fronts. Direct contact between the Matsés and non-Indigenous people commenced around the 1920s. In a 1926 interview, between Romanoff and a Peruvian man working on the Gálvez river, the Peruvian declared that rubber bosses were unable to set up on the Choba river due to Indigenous attacks. These attacks ignited a response from the non-Indigenous people, as they intentionally kidnapped Matsés woman and children. In response, this intensified warfare and successful Matsés attacks meant that they were able to secure back their people, along with firearms and metal tools. Meanwhile, warfare between the Matsés and other Indigenous groups continued. By the 1950s, the wave of rubber tappers fizzled and later replaced by "logging activity and the trade in forest game and skins, mainly to supply the towns of Peruvian Amazonia" (De Almeida Matos, 2003).

Health 
Presently, the Matsés fail to receive adequate health care for over a decade. Consequently, there has not been evidence on a reduction in diseases such as "malaria, worms, tuberculosis, malnutrition and hepatitis" (De Almeida Matos, 2003). The lack of organization and distribution of appropriate vaccinations, medication and prevention methods are associated with the high levels of deaths among the Matsés. The issue at hand is that most Indigenous communities lack the medication and/or medical tools – microscopes, needles, thermometers – that help make basic diagnosis’ of infections or diseases. For instance, Matsés today obtain "high level of hepatitis B and D infections", the harsh reality is that hepatic complication, such as hepatitis D, can cause death in just a matter of days. It is unfortunate that the organization responsible for health care in the IT fails to live up to their role and as a consequence this negatively affects the Indigenous population, and additionally causes the Matsés communities to distrust the use of vaccines. This group of people now have a fear of falling ill, in addition to not receiving clear information as to what caused the symptoms of their deceased kin. Grievously, "The Matsés do not know how many of them are infected, but the constant loss of young people, most of them under 30 years old, generates a pervasive mood of sadness and fear" (De Almeida Matos, 2003).

Education 
In Brazil, Matsés communities are known to be a monolingual group, therefore, all villages contained a teacher from the community itself. Teachers tend to be elders, that the community trusts to teach the youth, but have never completed formal teacher training. Attempts have been made, to try and promote Indigenous teacher training. The state education secretary for the Amazons has been formally running a training course, yet the lack of organization means that the classes are offered sporadically (De Almeida Matos, 2003). Presently, there only exists two Matsés schools located in the "Flores and Três José villages" constructed by the Atalaia do Norte municipal council. Despite complaints from the Matsés communities, funding and construction of official Matsés schools are rare. As consequent, Matsés parents, in the hope to provide their family with higher education and greater job opportunities, send their children out to neighbouring towns for their education. The lack of Matsés schools - that would have focused on Indigenous knowledge, culture, and language - consequently raises the likelihood of children assimilating to a culture unlike their own. Therefore, decreasing the chances of cultural transmission onto the next generation of Matsés children.

Language Family 
Currently, the Matsés belongs to one of the largest subsets within the Northern Pano region. Notably, Panoan suggests, a family of languages that are geographically known to be spoken in Peru, western Brazil, and Bolivia. The Panoan language, in more detail, falls under the larger Pano-Tacanan family.  Like the Matsés, the subset includes other Indigenous groups, including Matis, Kulina-Pano, Maya, Korubo, in addition to, other groups that presently evade contact with the outside world (De Almeida Matos, 2003). Not only is this subset culturally similar, but also recognizes that they all share mutually intelligible languages. With this in mind, compared to the other groups in the northern Pano subset, the Matsés are known to have the largest of populations.

Literature Review 
Bibliographies that are about Panoan and Matsés/Mayoruna linguistic and anthropological sources can be found in Fabre (1998), Erikson (2000), and Erikson et el. (1994). A Pano-Takana bibliography, that was written by Chavarría Mendoza in 1983, is outdated but still has relevant and interesting information about some linguistic and anthropological works on the Matsés (Fleck, 2003, p. 41). Missionaries from the Summer Institute of Linguistics (SIL) produced the first descriptions of the Matsés language, those involved included  Harriet Kneeland and Harriet L. Fields. Interestingly, researchers utilized escaped captives as consultants and were able to study the language and culture from captives verbal affirmations, before being able to make contact in 1969. The most extensive published grammatical description of this language is education work done by the SIL, which was intended to teach the Matsés language to Spanish speakers. This work focused on the morphology of the language, as well as the phonology and syntax systems. Literature that included phonological descriptions, grammatical descriptions, collections of texts and word lists can be found in the work published by Fields and Kneeland, from approximately the years from 1966 to 1981. In Kneeland 1979, there is an extensive modern lexicon for Matsés which includes approximately an 800-word Matsés -Spanish glossary, along with some sample sentences. Whereas, Wise 1973 contains a Spanish-Matsés  word list with approximately 150 entries (Fleck, 2003, p. 43).

A Brazilian fieldworker and linguist named Carmen Teresa Dorigo de Carvalho, has been conducting linguistic analyses that are based on her work about the Brazilian Matsés. Her contributions to the study of this language included her Master's thesis on Matsés sentence structure and a PhD dissertation on Matsés phonology, more specifically, it is based on an optimality theory treatment of Matsés syllable structure and many other aspects of the phonology of this language (Fleck, 2003, p. 43).  In addition to this work, she published an article about Matsés tense and aspect, an article on split ergativity, and an unpublished paper on negation in Matsés and Marubo.

Organizations that Promote Indigenous Rights and Documentation Projects 
The non-governmental organization, Indigenous Word Center (CTI) was founded in March 1979 by anthropologists and indigenists who had already done prior work with some Indigenous people in Brazil. This organization has a mark of its identity with the Indigenous people that way they can effectively contribute to having control of their territories, clarifying the role of the State and protecting and guaranteeing their constitutional rights. This organization operates on the Indigenous Lands located in the Amazon, Cerrado and Atlantic Forest Biomes (Centro de Trabalgo Indigenista, 2011). The general coordinator of this organization is Gilberto Azanha and the program coordinator is Maria Elisa Ladeira. The Socio-Environmental Institute (ISA) that was founded on April 22, 1994, is an organization of Civil Society of Public Interest by people with training and experience in the fight for environmental and social rights. The objective of this organization is to defend social, collective and diffuse goods and rights that have to do with cultural heritage, the environment, or humans right. The ISA is in charge of research and various studies, they implement projects and programs that promote social and environmental sustainability as well as valuing cultural and biological diversity of the country. The board of directors of this organization include Neide Esterci, Marina Kahn, Ana Valéria Araújo, Anthony Gross, and Jurandir Craveiro Jr (Centro de Trabalgo Indigenista, 2011).

Other Materials 
Comprehensive descriptions of the general Matsés culture can be found in Romanoff's 1984 dissertation, discussion of the Mayoruna subgroups history and culture can be found in Erikson's 1994 and information about Matsés contemporary culture and history can be found in Matlock's 2002 dissertation (Fleck, 2003, p. 46). The first anthropologist to work among the Matsés was Steven Romanoff, but he has only published an article on Matsés land use and a short article on Matsés women as hunters, in addition to his Ph.D. dissertation. Erikson 1990a, 1992a, and 2001 are all useful published ethnographic studies about the Matis in Brazil, which are relevant to the description of the Mayoruna subgroup, but it does not have data on the Matsés. Luis Calixto Méndez, a Peruvian anthropologist has also been working with the Matsés for several years. At first he did some ethnographic research among the Matsés, but in recent years his research has been restricted to administrative work for the Non-Government Organization Centre for Amazonian Indigenous Development (Fleck, 2003, p. 47).

Phonology

Matsés has 21 distinctive segments: 15 consonants and 6 vowels. Along with these vowels and consonants, contrastive stress also is a part of the phoneme inventory. The following charts contain the consonants and vowels of the language, as well as their major allophones that are indicated in parentheses.

Vowels
The vowel system of Matsés is peculiar in that no vowels are rounded.

Consonants
The consonants of Matsés according to (Fleck, 2003, p. 72)

Morphology
The Indigenous Brazilian language, Matsés is a language that falls into the classification of both an isolating and a polysynthetic language. Typically, single-morpheme words are common, and some longer words could include to about 10 morphemes. Still, the general use of morphemes per word in the language have the tendency to involve 3 to 4 (Fleck, 2003 p. 204).  Half of the Matsés language makes use of simple morphemes, while "verbal inflectional suffixes, transitivity agreement enclitics, and class-changing suffixes are, with very few exceptions, portmanteau morphemes" (Fleck, 2003 p. 204).  Morphemes normally, imply a one-to-one association between the two domains, but the Matsés language permits portmanteau morphemes to be part of the morphology. The distinction applies to morphemes, as productive synchronically segmented forms, while a formative morpheme includes "historical forms that are fossilized sub-morphemic elements with form-meaning associations" (Fleck, 2003 p. 206). Interestingly, root words in the language, possess lexical meaning and needs to occupy the nuclear parts of the word. What helps identify the nuclear word, is when it involves the use of free morphemes within the phrase, also if it occurs alone without other phonologically attached material (Fleck, 2003 p. 206). Free and bound morphemes also distinguish roots from affixes/clitics. It is important to note that roots are morphemes that can also occur with inflectional morphology. With that being said, some adverbs must be inflected for a transitivity agreement as well as verbs that are not being used in the imperative mode, or that occur alone as monomorphemic words. Reason being, semantically monomorphemic words are incompatible with the imperative mode (Fleck, 2003 p. 206).  All roots in the language can occur with no phonologically attached material, or with inflectional morphology. A stem is combined with either a root with one, none, or multiple affixes/clitics (Fleck, 2003 p. 207). While, words are defined as a stem that is combined with inflectional suffixes, when it is necessary to do so.

A pronoun is a word used as a substitute for a noun, it may function alone or as a noun phrase to refer either to the participants in the discourse or to something mentioned in the discourse. Typically, in Matsés, pronouns are divided into four types: personal, interrogative, indefinite, and demonstrative (Fleck, 2003 p. 240). Each of these types of pronouns include three case-specific forms, that are known as absolutive, ergative/instrumental and genitive. Pronouns in this language are not distinguished by number, gender, social status or personal relations between the participants in the discourse (Fleck, 2003 p. 240).

(Fleck, 2003, p. 244)

Inflection vs Derivation 
Inflection is the change in the form of a word, usually by adding a suffix to the ending, which would mark distinctions such as tense, number, gender, mood, person, voice and case. Whereas, derivation is a formation of a new word or injectable stem that comes from another word or stem. This usually occurs by adding an affix to the word, which would make the new word have a different word class from the original.  In Matsés, inflection normally only occurs on verbs as a lexical-class-wide and syntactic-position-wide phenomenon. There are a set of suffixes that include finite inflection and class-changing suffixes that must occur on finite verbs. Adjectives are also a word class that have a lexical-class-wide inflection. Adverbs and postpositions have a marginal inflectional category known as transitivity agreement.

Traditionally, derivational morphology includes meaning-changing, valence-changing and class-changing morphology. In the reading A Grammar of Matsés by David Fleck, he uses the term "derivational" to refer to only meaning-changing and valence-changing morphology. This is due to the fact that class-changing morphology patterns are closely related to inflectional suffixes. For the verbs in Matsés, the inflectional suffixes and class-changing suffixes are in pragmatic contrast, (shown in example 1), so it could be concluded that all verbs in this language either require class-changing morphology or inflection (Fleck, 2003 p. 212).

Table 2 displays the differences between derivational and inflectional/class-changing morphology in the language Matsés (Fleck, 2003 p. 213).

Reduplication 
There was a generalization put forth by Payne (1990:218) stating that in lowland South American languages, all cases of reduplication is iconic. This means that it is indicating imperfective action, greater intensity, progressive aspect, iterative, plurality, or onomatopoeia of repeated sounds. But, the language Matsés, does not confirm this generalization. In Matsés there are various different meanings that have to do with reduplication, which includes iconic, non-iconic, and "counter-iconic" reduplication. A summary of the different functions and meanings of reduplication in Matsés are shown in Table 3 (Fleck, 2003 p. 220).

(Fleck, 2003 p. 220).

Syntax

Case and Agreement 
The Indigenous Brazilian language known as Matsés, is considered to be an ergative-absolutive system. Sentences in this language case mark the subject of an intransitive sentence equal to the object of a transitive sentence. In particular, the subject of a transitive sentence is treated as the ergative, while the subject of an intransitive verb and the object of a transitive verb is weighed as the absolutive (Fleck, 2003 p. 828). To identify core arguments based on noun phrases, absolutive argument are identified via noun or noun phrase that are not the final part of a larger phrase and occur without an overt marker (Fleck, 2003 p. 824). Non-absolutive nominals are marked in one of the three following ways i) case-marking ii) phonologically independent, directly following postposition word or iii) occurs as a distinct form, that generally incorporates a nasal (Fleck, 2003 p. 824). In contrast, ergative arguments are identifiable through ergative nouns or noun phrases’ that are "case-marked with the enclitic -n, identical to instrumental and genitive case markers, and to the locative/temporal postpositional enclitic" (Fleck, 2003 p. 825). Important to note, is that pronoun forms are easier distinctive, in form and/or distribution (Fleck, 2003 p. 826). There are four pronominal forms associated with the four -n enclitics and this suggests that there are four independent markers in contrast to a single morpheme with a broader range of functions. Enclitics suggest that the four markers could be either: ergative, genitive, instrumental and locative, where each enclitic represent different kinds of morphemes (Fleck, 2003 p. 827). The locative noun phrase can be replaced by deictic adverbs where as an ergative, genitive, and instrumental are replaced by pronouns in the language. The locative postpositional enclitic -n is the core argument marker, and additionally is phonologically identified to the ergative case marker. This means, that it can code two different semantic roles, locative and temporal. (Fleck, 2003 p. 829). Ergative and absolutive are imposed by predicates and are later identified as cases, since they are lexically specified by the verbs, and never occur optionally. Adjacently, genitive cases are not governed by predicates but rather the structure of the possessive noun phrase. Since, most possessive noun phrases require the possessor to be marked as a genitive, some postposition require their objects to be in the genitive case if human (Fleck, 2003 p. 829). Together with, coding ownership, interpersonal relation, or a part-whole relation, the genitive marker obtains the syntactic function of marking the genitive noun as subordinate to a head noun (Fleck, 2003 p. 830). Finally, instrumental is that least prototypical case however, like the ergative, instrumental is allowed per clause. Unlike the ergative, it occurs optionally. Instrumental cases also require remote causative constructions of inanimate causes to appear and if there is an overt agent in a passive clause, than by definition it is an instrumental case (Fleck, 2003 p. 831).

Semantics

Plurals 
In Matsés, the suffix -bo may be optionally attached to a noun that refers to humans, but excluding pronouns. This is used to specify that the referent involves a homogeneous category, shown in example 1, but it could also occur with a non-human reference to show a heterogeneous category, although this is quite rare (example 2 and 3) (Fleck, 2003 p. 273).

Usually a Matsés speaker would leave out the -bo suffix and let the speaker figure out the plurality from the context, or if number is important in the context, the speaker would use a quantitative adverb such as daëd ‘two’, tëma ‘few’, dadpen ‘many’ (Fleck, 2003 p. 273).

Another plurality indicator in this language is the suffix -ado. This suffix is used to specify that all members are being included and it can even include members that are in similar categories, whereas the suffix -bo only refers to a subset of a kinship category. This difference is shows in example 7a and 7b (Fleck, 2003 p. 275).

Pisabo "language"

Pisabo, also known as Pisagua (Pisahua), is a purported Panoan language spoken by approximately 600 people in Peru and formerly in Brazil, where it was known as Mayo (Maya, Maia) and was evidently the language known as Quixito. However, no linguistic data is available, and it is reported to be mutually intelligible with Matses.

Notes

References

 
  
 
 
 
 
 

Agglutinative languages
Languages of Peru
Indigenous languages of Western Amazonia
Panoan languages